St. Paul's College, Kalamassery located at Kochi was founded by Joseph Attipetty, the late Archbishop of Verapoly to commemorate the historic visit of Pope Paul VI to India in connection with the 38th International Eucharistic Congress held in November - December 1964. The foundation stone of the college was blessed by the pope on 3 December 1964 and was solemnly laid by Samuel Mathai, the Vice-Chancellor of the University of Kerala in the presence of Joseph Attipetty on 13 February 1965. Out of his filial devotion to the Pope, the founder desired that the college be named after the Apostle Paul, the patron saint of the Pope.

The college started functioning from 13 July 1965 imparting instruction to students for the two year pre-degree course. The first degree course, B.Com. was introduced in the year 1978 and gradually other degree courses such as B.Sc. Physics, B.Sc. Mathematics and B.A. Economics were introduced. St. Paul's College became a first grade college with the introduction of M.A. Economics in the year 1982. At present the college offers postgraduate courses in economics, physics, mathematics, chemistry, commerce and English. The Department of Physics and Commerce are research centres of Mahatma Gandhi University. Co-education was introduced in the college in the year 1983. Vocational degree courses in English and chemistry have been introduced in 1998 and 1999 respectively. In October 1983 Mahatma Gandhi University came into existence and St. Paul's College was affiliated to it.

The college received the first National Assessment and Accreditation Council (NAAC) accreditation in the year 2004 and was graded at the ‘B+’ level and second cycle of accreditation graded the college with ‘B’ grade in the year 2010. A change in the academic and infrastructural domains accredited the college ‘A’ grade in the cycle of re-accreditation by NAAC in 2016.

Undergraduate courses (13) 
Bachelors of Science - B.Sc. Mathematics - 6 semesters - Aided 
Bachelors of Science - B.Sc. Physics - 6 semesters - Aided 
Bachelors of Science - B.SC. Chemistry - 6 semesters - Aided 
Bachelors of Arts - B.A Economics - 6 semesters - Aided 
Bachelors of Commerce - B.Com. with Computer Application - 6 semesters - Aided 
Bachelors of Commerce - B.Com. with Taxation - 6 semesters - Aided 
Bachelors of Arts - B.A. English Model 2 - 6 semesters - Aided 
Bachelors of English - B.A. English Model I - 6 semesters - Self Finance
Bachelors of Science - B.Sc. Computer Science - 6 semesters - Self Finance 
Bachelors of Commerce - B.Com. with Computer Application - 6 semesters - Self Finance 
Bachelors of Business Administration - B.B.A. - 6 semesters - Self Finance 
Bachelors of Vocation - B.Voc. Tourism and Hospitality - 6 semesters - Aided 
Bachelors of Vocation - B.Voc. Banking and Financial Service - 6 semesters - Aided
Bachelors of Vocation - B.Voc. Broadcasting and Journalism - 6 semesters - Aided

Postgraduate courses (6) 
M. A. in Economics (Master of Arts) - 4 semesters - Aided
M.Sc. in mathematics (Master of Science) - 4 semesters - Aided
M.Sc. in physics with specialization in Computer Science (Master of Science) - 4 semesters - Aided
M.Com. Finance (Master of Commerce) - 4 semesters - Aided
M.Sc. in chemistry (Master of Science) - 4 semesters - Self Finance
M. A. in English Language and Literature (Master of Arts) - 4 semesters - Self Finance

Research programmes (Ph.D.) 

Four of the postgraduate departments are recognized research centers under the Mahatma Gandhi University, Kottayam. These centers offer full-time and part-time research facilities.
Mathematics 
Economics
Physics
Commerce

Notable alumni
 Justice Ziyad Rahman A. A, Judge, Kerala High Court
 Binoy Viswam, Ex-Member of Parliament
 P. Rajeev, Minister for Law & Industries, Government of Kerala
 T. J. Vinod, MLA
 Siddique (director), Indian Film Industry 
 Chemban Vinod Jose, Actor, Malayalam film industry 
 Nadirsha, Actor
Arun Cherukavil, Actor
 Beena Antony, Actress 
 Basil Thampi, cricketer
 Bentla D'Coth, International football referee
 Shaiju Damodaran, sports commentator and journalist

Succession list of patrons 
Joseph Attipetty (Late)
Joseph Kelanthara (Late)
Cornelius Elanjikkal (Late)
Daniel Acharuparambil (Late)
Francis Kallarakal (Emeritus) 
Joseph Kalathiparambil (Incumbent)

Succession list of managers/chairmen 
Jose Chelangara
Felix Chakkalakal, 2014 - 2019
Antony Arackal, 2019 - continuing

Cultural clubs
Football Club 
Tennis Club 
Hockey Club 
Cricket Club 
Basketball Club 
Volleyball Club 
Athletic Club 
Indoor Games 
Gymnasium 
Martial Arts 
Badminton Club 
Tables Tennis Club 
Film Club 
Quiz Club 
Debate Club - Oratory Club 
Literary Club 
Sahityavedi 
Music Club 
Fine Arts Club 
Nature Club
Photography Club 
Encon Club 
Mindsports 
Tourism Club 
Astronomy Club
Theatre Club

Associations 
Vincent de Paul 
Jesus Youth 
AICUF 
Xavier Board of Higher Education

References 

Catholic universities and colleges in India
Arts and Science colleges in Kerala
Universities and colleges in Kochi
Colleges affiliated to Mahatma Gandhi University, Kerala
Educational institutions established in 1965
1965 establishments in Kerala